Robina Gureme Rwakoojo is a Ugandan Lawyer, legislator who is currently serving as the representative member of Parliament for Gomba West County in Gomba District in the eleventh parliament of Uganda. She is affiliated to the National Resistance Movement (NRM). She also served in the tenth Parliament of Uganda. She also joined the race for Deputy Speakership in of the 11th parliament of Uganda.

Biography 
Robina Gureme Rwakoojo was born on 17 July 1964 from an Anglican family. She completed her Primary Leaving Examinations 1976 from Nakasero Primary School. She went to Nabumali High School from where she completed her Uganda Certificate of Education in 1980. And from Kings College Budo in 1984, she completed her Uganda Advanced Certificate of Education.

Rwakoojo Gureme Rwakoojo graduated with a bachelor's degree in Law from Makerere University in 1990. She finished her  Postgraduate Diploma in Legal Practice from Law Development Centre in 1990 and a Postgraduate Diploma in Public Administration and Management from Uganda Management Institute in  2007.

Work experience 
Robina Gureme Rwakoojo was a Pupil State Attorney for Administrator Generals Department under Ministry of Justice and Constitutional Affairs from 1990 - 1992 and within the same organization, she became the State Attorney from 1992 - 1995. She became the Senior State Attorney for Administrator Generals Department under Ministry of Justice and Constitutional Affairs from 1995 - 1996. And for the Directorate of Legal Advisory Services under Ministry of Justice and Constitutional Affairs, she was ( a Senior State Attorney from 1996 - 1999 and she later became the  Principal State Attorney 1999 - 2003).

She became the Principal State Attorney for Directorate of Civil Litigation under Ministry of Justice and Constitutional Affairs from 2003 - 2007. She became the Acting Head, for Directorate of Civil Litigation under the Ministry of Justice and Constitutional Affairs from 2007 - 2008. Rwakoojo became the  Acting Director Civil Litigation for Ministry of Justice and Constitutional Affairs from 2008 - 2013. She became the Commissioner Line Ministries for Directorate of Civil Litigation under Ministry of Justice and Constitutional Affairs from 2010 - 2015. In 2016, she won the Seat for being the Representative Member of Parliament for Gomba West County in Gomba District in the tenth Parliament of Uganda. She was re-elected for the same seat in 2021.

She sits on the committee for Appointments, and is Chair of Legal & Parliamentary Affairs in the eleventh parliament of Uganda. She served as the vice-chairperson of the Equal Opportunities Committee in the tenth parliament. She was also appointed to head the select committee by Parliament on the directive of Speaker Rebecca Kadaga which investigated allegations of  sexual violence and harassment  in schools, universities and tertiary institutions.

Other contributions 
some of Robina Gureme Rwakoojo other works and contributions include Sponsoring Football Teams in The Area,  Supporting Women SACCOS, Completing of Borehole  Project in Mpanda, Kyegonza, Kanoni TC for her people in Gomba West County. She also participated in the investigating of sexual violence and harassment in schools, universities and tertiary institutions. She also participated in the second  reading of Constitution Amendment Bill and she voted Yes to it. She has also participated in many court cases

See also 
List of members of the eleventh Parliament of Uganda
National Resistance Movement 
List of members of the eleventh Parliament of Uganda 
List of members of the tenth Parliament of Uganda

References

External links 
 Website of the Parliament of Uganda

Uganda Management Institute alumni
Law Development Centre alumni
People from Gomba District
National Resistance Movement politicians
Ugandan women's rights activists
1976 births
Living people
Ugandan women lawyers
Women members of the Parliament of Uganda
Members of the Parliament of Uganda
21st-century Ugandan politicians
21st-century Ugandan women politicians